Zagrađe may refer to:

In Bosnia and Herzegovina:

Zagrađe, settlement in Municipality of Kakanj
 Zagrađe, Kladanj, settlement in Municipality of Kladanj
Zagrađe, settlement in Municipality of Kotor Varoš
Zagrađe, settlement in Municipality of Sokolac
Zagrađe, Travnik, settlement in Municipality of Travnik

In Croatia:
 Zagrađe, Croatia

In Montenegro:
Zagrađe, Bar
Zagrađe, Berane Municipality

In Serbia:
Zagrađe, Gornji Milanovac
Zagrađe, Kuršumlija
Zagrađe, Zaječar